Callistola elegans is a species of tortoise and leaf-mining beetles in the tribe Cryptonychini. It is found in the West Pacific.

References

External links 
 

Cassidinae
Beetles described in 1960
Insects of Japan